This is a list of works by the American composer Elliott Carter.

Ballet 
Pocahontas (1938–39)
The Minotaur (1947), choreographed by George Balanchine and John Taras

Opera 
What Next? (opera in one act; libretto by Paul Griffiths) (1997)

Choral 
Tarantella for men's chorus and two pianos (1937)
Let's Be Gay for women's chorus and two pianos (1937)
Harvest Home for a cappella choir (1937)
To Music for a cappella choir (1937)
Heart Not So Heavy for a cappella choir (1939)
The Defense of Corinth for speaker, men's chorus and piano four hands (1941)
The Harmony of Morning for women's chorus and chamber orchestra (1944)
Musicians Wrestle Everywhere for mixed chorus (SSATB) a capella or with strings (1945)
Emblems for men's chorus and piano (1947)

Concertante 
Double Concerto for Harpsichord and Piano with Two Chamber Orchestras (1959–61)
Piano Concerto (1964–65)
Concerto for Orchestra (1969)
Oboe Concerto (1986–1987)
Violin Concerto (1990)
Clarinet Concerto (1996)
Cello Concerto (2000)
Boston Concerto (2002)
Dialogues for piano and chamber orchestra (2003)
Mosaic for harp and ensemble (2004)
Soundings for piano and orchestra (2005)
Horn Concerto (2006)
Interventions for piano and orchestra (2007)
Flute Concerto (2008)
Concertino for bass clarinet and chamber orchestra (2009)
Two Controversies and a Conversation for piano, percussion, and chamber orchestra (2010–11)
Dialogues II for piano and chamber orchestra (2012)

Orchestra 
Symphony No. 1 (1942, revised 1954)
Holiday Overture (1944, revised 1961)
Variations for Orchestra (1954–1955)
A Symphony of Three Orchestras (1976)
Three Occasions for Orchestra (1986–89)
"A Celebration of Some 150x100 Notes"
"Remembrance"
"Anniversary"
Symphonia: sum fluxae pretium spei (1993–96)
Partita
Adagio Tenebroso
Allegro Scorrevole
Three Illusions for Orchestra (2002–04)
"Micomicón"
"Fons Juventatis"
"More's Utopia"
Sound Fields for string orchestra (2007)
Instances for chamber orchestra (2012)

Large ensemble 
Penthode for ensemble (1985)
Asko Concerto for sixteen players (2000)
Réflexions for ensemble (2004)
Wind Rose for wind ensemble (2008)

Chamber 
Pastoral for english horn and piano (1940, revised 1982, arrangements for clarinet, viola and alto saxophone exist)
Canonic Suite for four alto saxophones or four clarinets (1939, published in 1945, revised in 1981)
Elegy for viola and piano, also version for string quartet (1943, revised 1961)
Cello Sonata (1948)
Woodwind Quintet (1948)
Eight Etudes and a Fantasy for wind quartet (1949) 
String Quartet No. 1 (1951)
Sonata for flute, oboe, cello, and harpsichord (1952)
String Quartet No. 2 (1959)
Canon for 3 (1971)
String Quartet No. 3 (1971)
Brass Quintet (1974)
Duo for violin and piano (1974)
Birthday Fanfare for three trumpets, vibraphone, and glockenspiel (1978)
Triple Duo (1983)
Esprit rude/esprit doux for flute and clarinet (1984)
Canon for 4 (1984)
String Quartet No. 4 (1986)
Enchanted Preludes for flute and cello (1988)
Con leggerezza pensosa for clarinet, violin, and cello (1990)
Quintet for piano and winds (1991)
Trilogy for oboe and harp (1992)
Bariolage for harp
Inner Song for oboe
Immer Neu for oboe and harp
Esprit rude/esprit doux II for flute, clarinet, and marimba (1994)
Fragment I for string quartet (1994)
String Quartet No. 5 (1995)
Luimen for ensemble (1997)
Quintet for piano and string quartet (1997)
Fragment II for string quartet (1999)
Oboe Quartet, for oboe, violin, viola, and cello (2001)
Hiyoku for two clarinets (2001)
Au Quai for bassoon and viola (2002)
Call for two trumpets and horn (2003)
Clarinet Quintet (2007)
Tintinnabulation for percussion sextet (2008)
Tre Duetti for violin and cello (2008, 2009)
Duettone
Adagio
Duettino
Nine by Five for wind quintet (2009)
Trije glasbeniki for flute, bass clarinet, and harp (2011)
String Trio (2011)
Double Trio for trumpet, trombone, percussion, piano, violin and cello (2011)
Rigmarole for cello and bass clarinet (2011)
Epigrams for violin, cello, and piano (2012)

Voice 
My Love Is in a Light Attire for voice and piano (1928)
Tell Me Where Is Fancy Bred for voice and guitar (1938)
A Mirror on Which to Dwell for soprano and ensemble (1975)
Syringa for mezzo-soprano, bass-baritone, guitar, and ensemble (1978)
Three Poems of Robert Frost for baritone and ensemble (1942, orchestrated 1980)
In Sleep, in Thunder for tenor and ensemble (1981)
Of Challenge and of Love for soprano and piano (1994)
Tempo e Tempi for soprano, oboe, clarinet, violin, and cello (1998–99)
Of Rewaking for mezzo-soprano and orchestra (2002)
In the Distances of Sleep for mezzo-soprano and chamber orchestra (2006)
Mad Regales for six solo voices (2007)
La Musique for solo voice (2007)
Poems of Louis Zukofsky (2008) for mezzo-soprano and clarinet
On Conversing with Paradise (2008) for baritone and chamber orchestra
What Are Years (2009) for soprano and chamber orchestra
A Sunbeam's Architecture (2010) for tenor and chamber orchestra
Three Explorations (2011) for bass-baritone, winds, and brass
The American Sublime (2011) for baritone and large ensemble

Piano 
Piano Sonata (1945–46)
Night Fantasies (1980)
90+ (1994)
Two Diversions (1999)
Retrouvailles (2000)
Two Thoughts about the Piano (2005–06)
"Intermittences"
"Caténaires"
Tri-Tribute (2007–08)
"Sistribute"
"Fratribute"
"Matribute"

Solo instrumental 
Eight Pieces for Four Timpani (1949/66)
Changes for guitar (1983)
Scrivo in Vento for flute (1991)
Gra for clarinet, also version for trombone (1994)
Figment for cello (1994)
A 6-letter Letter for English horn (1996)
Shard for guitar (1997)
Four Lauds for solo violin (1999, 1984, 2000, 1999)
"Statement – Remembering Aaron"
"Riconoscenza per Goffredo Petrassi"
"Rhapsodic Musings"
"Fantasy – Remembering Roger"
Figment II for cello (2001)
Steep Steps for bass clarinet (2001)
Retracing for bassoon (2002)
HBHH for oboe (2007)
Figment III for contrabass (2007)
Figment IV for viola (2007)
Figment V for marimba (2009)
Retracing II for horn (2009)
Retracing III for trumpet (2009)
Retracing IV for tuba (2011)
Retracing V for trombone (2011)
Mnemosyné for violin (2011)
Figment VI for oboe (2011)

References 

Carter, Elliott